The 2007 ICF Canoe Sprint World Championships were held in Duisburg, Germany on August 9–12, 2007 for the record-tying fourth time. The German city had hosted the championships previously in 1979, 1987, and 1995. It tied Duisburg with Belgrade, Serbia (then Yugoslavia) who hosted in 1971, 1975, 1978, and 1982.

Men race as individuals, pairs and quads over 200 m, 500 m and 1000 m in both Canoe (Canadian) (C) and Kayak (K) events, giving a total of 18 gold medals. Women compete for only 9 gold medals as they race in kayak events only.

This was the 36th championships in canoe sprint.

Highlights
Both German and Hungarian paddlers won 9 gold medals. With 6 silver Germany topped the medal table, while Hungarians finished first on the point table.

In the women's events the two nations shared all world titles. Since Natasa Janics left the legendary pair with Katalin Kovács all K-2 races were ruled by the German paddlers. However, Katalin Kovács won K-1 1000 m and 500 m, and gained two silvers in the K-4 events, while former partner Natasa Janics won the individual over 200 m. Hungarian team won the K-4 on 1000 m, and Germans the 500 m and 200 m.

In the men's races, the C-2 500 m final saw György Kolonics win his fifteenth and final championship title which is an outstanding record in the history of canoe sprint. Ronald Rauhe and Tim Wieskötter of Germany won their sixth K-2 500 m title in a row.

Medal summary

Men's
 Non-Olympic classes

Canoe

Kayak

Women's
 Non-Olympic classes

Kayak

Medal table

References
International Canoe Federation

Icf Canoe Sprint World Championships, 2007
Icf Canoe Sprint World Championships, 2007
ICF Canoe Sprint World Championships
International sports competitions hosted by Germany
Canoeing and kayaking competitions in Germany